Berkåk Station is a railway station located in the village of Berkåk in the municipality of Rennebu in Trøndelag county, Norway.  It is located close to the European route E06 highway.

The station is located along the Dovrebanen railway line, and it is served by four daily express trains each direction to Oslo and Trondheim as well as a few commuter trains to Trondheim.  There are buses connections to the town of Orkanger by AtB.

The station was opened in 1921 as part of the Dovre Line when it was extended from Dombås to Trondheim.

References

Rennebu
Railway stations in Trøndelag
Railway stations on the Dovre Line
Railway stations opened in 1921
1921 establishments in Norway